Indian Nocturne is a 1984 novella by the Italian writer Antonio Tabucchi. It tells the story of a man on a search for his mysterious friend in India. The book won the French Prix Médicis étranger in 1987. Alain Corneau directed a 1989 French film adaptation with the title Nocturne indien.

See also
 1984 in literature
 Italian literature

References

1984 novels
Italian novels adapted into films
Novels by Antonio Tabucchi
Novels set in India
20th-century Italian novels